Death in Dunwich is an adventure published by Theatre of the Mind Enterprises in 1983 for the horror role-playing game Call of Cthulhu .

Contents
Death in Dunwich, written by Ed Wimble, was Theatre of the Mind's first licensed adventure for Chaosium's Call of Cthulhu role-playing game. The adventure begins as a murder mystery regarding an art dealer found dead in the town of Dunwich. The book includes 
 the adventure
 statistics for pre-generated characters
 player handouts that can be photocopied 
 a page of text that was erroneously left out of the book before printing.

Reception
Jon Sutherland reviewed Death in Dunwich for White Dwarf #48, giving it an overall rating of 8 out of 10, and stated that "Death in Dunwich can be interesting, frustrating and terminal and consequently is the better of the two [when compared to Arkham Evil]."

In the November 1984 edition of Dragon (Issue #91), Ken Rolston thought that Call of Cthulhu lent itself to murder mysteries better than any other role-playing game, but found issue with the organization of this adventure, and noted that no summary or chronology of the adventure is provided for the referee. Rolston also criticized the fact that only bare statistics are given for pre-generated characters, with no background for the players to use. Despite these issues, Rolston called this "an excellent adventure and an example of what good role-playing mystery should be. The theme is imaginative and engaging. The narrative is a sequence of well-developed episodes with many clues and false leads, with important informants who must be discovered and interrogated, and with a wealth of evidence — police reports, newspaper articles, and NPC testimonials — that must be sifted for significance by the players." Rolston praised the macabre elements that "are contrasted nicely against the mundane setting of a rural New England town." He concluded with a strong recommendation, saying, "Though the weaknesses in presentation in Death in Dunwich are unfortunate, they are understandable, given the particular problems of designing, organizing, and presenting role-playing mystery adventures. The mystery itself is detailed, challenging, and dramatic. The horror is satisfactorily evil and gruesome in the style, and the setting, background, and characters are effectively detailed." 

Richard Lee reviewed Death in Dunwich for Imagine magazine, and stated that "Unfortunately, there are two major failings. Firstly, DiD is very short. For [the price] you expect more than this single-facet plot. Secondly, the atmosphere is wrong. DiD, one feels, is more influenced by low-budget horror films than by Lovecraft. What use is a Cthulhu supplement where the paranormal is the flaw of the story?! Overall, I'm afraid, the adventure left me cold."

In the March-April 1985 edition of Space Gamer (Issue No. 73), Matthew J. Costello found the price of the book ($8) to be a bit high, but nonetheless gave a thumbs up, saying, "I recommend Death in Dunwich for players with a bit of experience and tact who are ready to concentrate on a murder mystery instead of the Cthulhu mythos. There might be a problem if you feel [the price] is too much for one day of play, but you do get background material as well as the adventure itself."

Reviews
Different Worlds #32 (Jan./Feb., 1984)
Jeux & Stratégie #33 (as "Meurtre à Dunwich")

References

Call of Cthulhu (role-playing game) adventures
Role-playing game supplements introduced in 1983